The Clain is a  long river in western France, a left tributary of the river Vienne. Its source is near Hiesse, Charente.

The Clain flows generally north, through the following departments and towns:

Charente
Vienne: Pressac, Vivonne, Poitiers.

It joins the Vienne near Châtellerault, Cenon-sur-Vienne.

Among its tributaries are the Boivre, the Clouère and the Vonne.

References

Rivers of France
Rivers of Charente
Rivers of Vienne
Rivers of Nouvelle-Aquitaine